Wille Mäkelä (born 2 March 1974 in Hyvinkää) is a Finnish curler and Olympic medalist. He received a silver medal at the 2006 Winter Olympics in Torino.

He has obtained two bronze medals in the World Curling Championships, and won a gold medal at the 2000 European Curling Championships with the Finnish team.

References

External links
 

1974 births
Living people
People from Hyvinkää
Finnish male curlers
Olympic curlers of Finland
Curlers at the 2002 Winter Olympics
Curlers at the 2006 Winter Olympics
Olympic silver medalists for Finland
Olympic medalists in curling
Medalists at the 2006 Winter Olympics
European curling champions
Sportspeople from Uusimaa
21st-century Finnish people